USCGC Sycamore (WLB-209) is a United States Coast Guard seagoing buoy tender, the second of her name and the ninth of the Juniper-class. She is now home-ported in Newport, Rhode Island, following a one year long Midlife Maintenance Availability (MMA) in Baltimore, Maryland. She was originally home-ported in Cordova, Alaska. Sycamore primarily tends to aids-to-navigation (ATON) in Martha's Vineyard, the Long Island Sound, Hudson River, and New York City Harbor and entrances; however she is also responsible for maintenance support of National Data Buoy Center's offshore weather buoys. In addition to her primary ATON role, Sycamore also performs other duties, such as, marine environmental protection, maritime law enforcement, domestic icebreaking, search and rescue, and homeland security missions.

Construction and characteristics

USCGC Sycamore was built by the Marinette Marine Corporation at Marinette, Wisconsin, launched in July 2001 and commissioned in Cordova, Alaska on 2 July 2002. Sycamore is propelled by two Caterpillar diesel engines rated at 3,100 horsepower, and has a top speed of 16 knots. She has a single controllable-pitch propeller, which along with bow and stern thrusters, allow the ship to be maneuvered to set buoys close offshore and in restricted waters. A dynamic global positioning system coupled with machinery plant controls and a chart display and information system allow station-keeping of the ship with an accuracy of within five meters of the planned position without human intervention. Sycamore is also equipped with an oil-skimming system known as the Spilled Oil Recovery System (SORS), which is used in her mission of maritime environmental protection. The cutter has a 2,875 square foot buoy deck area with a crane that is used for servicing large ocean buoys.

Mission
USCGC Sycamore has an area of responsibility within the First Coast Guard District which covers the U.S. states of Maine, New Hampshire, Massachusetts, Rhode Island, Connecticut, and New York. While her primary mission is servicing ATON, she is also tasked with maritime law enforcement, marine pollution prevention and response, treaty enforcement, homeland security missions, and search and rescue.

History

On 1 August 2006 Sycamore assisted the National Oceanic and Atmospheric Administration (NOAA) by transporting a towing assessment team to the stricken vessel MV Cougar Ace which was listing severely and in danger of sinking. She further assisted NOAA contract salvors by providing soundings in the area of the proposed mooring for the Cougar Ace and monitored the tow for oil spills while escorting the salvors T/T Gladiator and T/T Sea Victory. Sycamore enforced a security zone during the tow.   
During July 2010 Sycamore responded to the Deepwater Horizon oil spill by transiting the Panama Canal.
On 28 July 2013, the tug Krystal Sea was maneuvering an attached barge and the barge struck the port bow section of the moored Sycamore causing damage to the railings and deck.

Sycamore arrived at Curtis Bay, Maryland on March 25, 2019 for a midlife maintenance refit.  She was then assigned to Newport, Rhode Island after the refit. She arrived in Newport, in May 2020.

See also

 USCG seagoing buoy tender

Notes
Citations

References used

External links

 

2001 ships
Navigational aids
Juniper-class seagoing buoy tenders
Ships built by Marinette Marine
Ships of the United States Coast Guard